The 1988 Pacific Cup was the fourth edition of the Pacific Cup, a rugby league tournament held between Pacific teams. The tournament was hosted by Western Samoa and eventually won by the New Zealand Māori side, who defeated Western Samoa 26-16 in the final.

Squads
The Cook Islands included Denvour Johnston.
Coached by Richard Bolton, the New Zealand Māori squad included Morvin Edwards, captain Barry Harvey, Kelly Shelford, Mark Woods and Tawera Nikau. 
Tonga included John Fifita, captain Duane Mann and Dick Uluave.
Western Samoa included Paddy Tuimavave, Hitro Okesene and captain Olsen Filipaina.

Results

Group 1

Group 2

Finals

Fifth place play off

Semi-finals

Third place play off

Final

References

External links
International Competitions 1988 The Vault

Pacific Cup
Pacific Cup
Rugby league in Samoa
1988 in Samoa
Pacific Cup